9th Rifle Division can refer to:

 9th Guards Rifle Division
 9th Siberian Rifle Division
 131st Separate Motor Rifle Brigade, formerly 9th Rifle Division
 9th Don Rifle Division, renumbered 38th Rifle Division in 1936